Flow La Discoteka 2 is seventh álbum produced by DJ Nelson released March 6, 2007. It is a sequel to Flow la Discoteka.

Track listing

Chart performance
It peaked at No. 28 on the Billboard Top Latin Albums chart. On the Billboard Latin Rhythm Albums and Top Heatseekers charts, the album reached Nos. 6 and 20, respectively.

Chart positions

References

DJ Nelson albums
2007 compilation albums